Pimelea ciliata, commonly known as white banjine, is a species of flowering plant in the family Thymelaeaceae. It is a small shrub with white flowers and is endemic to Western Australia.

Description
The leaves are arranged in alternating pairs at right angles to the ones above and below so that the leaves are in 4 rows along the stems (decussate), upper surface is darker than the underside. The stems at the apex are orange-red to brownish becoming grey as they age. The flower stamens are marginally or greater in length than the sepals. Flowering occurs from August to December.

Taxonomy
Pimelea ciliata was first formally described in 1984 by Barbara Lynette Rye in the journal Nuytsia.

Distribution and habitat
White banjine grows in the south-west corner of Western Australia near Bindoon to near Margaret River and south-east to the Porongurup Range mostly on hills and breakaways in clay, sand, loam, granitic and lateritic soil.

References

ciliata
Malvales of Australia
Flora of Western Australia
Plants described in 1984
Taxa named by Barbara Lynette Rye